Medicine Woman is a documentary show first produced for the Aboriginal Peoples Television Network, an aboriginal television network in Canada.  A doctor's journey to investigate traditional healing in different cultures is the focus.
Created and directed by Shirley Cheechoo, it was co-produced by Gerry Sperling and 4 Square Productions in Saskatchewan.

See also
 Medicine woman

References

External links
Medicine Woman 
Medicine Woman on APTN

Aboriginal Peoples Television Network original programming
First Nations television series